Hillcrest Park Cemetery is located in Springfield, Massachusetts. Although it is not known when it was established, it is known that the Hillcrest Park Cemetery Association – those who oversee the cemetery – was founded in 1924.

Notable interments 
 Henry L. Bowles (1886–1932), U.S. Congressman
 Jack Butterfield (1919–2010), ice hockey administrator
 Frank Crumit (1889–1943, entertainer and composer
 John Garand (1888–1974), arms inventor
 Otis Earle Hall (1878–1939), Author of the 4-H Pledge, rural education pioneer
 Phil Page, baseball player
 Eddie Shore (1902–1985), hockey player

References

External links
 

Buildings and structures in Springfield, Massachusetts
Cemeteries in Hampden County, Massachusetts
Cemeteries established in the 1920s
1924 establishments in Massachusetts